Refahiye  is a town and district of Erzincan Province in the Eastern Anatolia region of Turkey. It covers an area of 1,744 km², and the elevation is 1,589 m. The district has a total population of 10,569 where 3730 live in the town of Refahiye. The mayor is Çakmak Paçacı (AKP).

The district is populated by Sunni Turks and Alevi Kurds.

References

External links
District governor's official website 
District municipality's official website 

Cities in Turkey
Populated places in Erzincan Province
Districts of Erzincan Province